Jilin–Hunchun intercity railway, also known as Jihun Passenger Dedicated Line, is a high-speed railway operated by China Railway High-speed in Jilin Province. It connects the major city of Jilin City with the eastern city of Hunchun near the border with Russia and North Korea. Project construction started on October 30, 2010, with operations commencing on September 20, 2015. The railway has been described as "Dongbei's most beautiful railway" (due to the terrain it runs through) and "the fastest way to Vladivostok" (4 hours by train from Shenyang to Hunchun, plus 4 hours by bus from Hunchun to Vladivostok). Reflecting the border location of the city, the new train station has its sign in four languages: Chinese, Korean, Russian, and English. Future prospects could see the line extended to Vladivostok.

History
 July 26, 2010: the project is eligible for the National Development and Reform Commission approval.
 October 30, 2010: the project officially started.
 September 20, 2015: officially opened.

Route
Line starting from Jilin City, the railway runs eastward towards Jiaohe. Crossing into Yanbian Korean Autonomous Prefecture the railway moves through Dunhua, Antu County, Yanji, Tumen and finally ending in Hunchun. Thus combined, bridges and tunnels cover more than 66% of the total route.

At Jilin, the line connects with the Changchun–Jilin intercity railway. Many services run between Hunchun and Changchun.

Stations
Nine stations are located along the route.

 Jilin
 Jiaohe West
 Weihuling North
 Dunhua (interchange with the Dunhua–Baihe high-speed railway, under construction)
 Dashitou South
 Antu West
 Yanji West
 Tumen North
 Hunchun

References

High-speed railway lines in China
Rail transport in Jilin
Jiaohe, Jilin
Jilin City
Standard gauge railways in China
Railway lines opened in 2015